Uuno Turhapuro – Suomen tasavallan herra presidentti is a 1992 Finnish comedy film written and directed by Ere Kokkonen. It is the sixteenth film in the Uuno Turhapuro series. Its name translates to "Uuno Turhapuro – the Mister President [sic] of the Republic of Finland".

The film got mediocre reviews compared to the other Turhapuro films. It also had a small audience and profited only 9,000 FIM.

Plot
Uuno Turhapuro becomes the President of Finland. Streets are named after him and honorary companies are arranged for him. He also tries to turn Finland into a kingdom.

External links

Spede Pasanen
Finnish comedy films
Finnish sequel films
1992 films
1990s Finnish-language films